Kråkerøy is an island and a former municipality in Viken county, Norway.

The island of Kråkerøy was separated from Glemmen as a municipality of its own January 1, 1908. At that time Kråkerøy had a population of 3,311. The rural municipality was (together with Borge, Onsøy and Rolvsøy) merged with the city of Fredrikstad January 1, 1994. Prior to the merger Kråkerøy had a population of 7,445.

In 1948 Kråkerøy was the site of the Kråkerøy speech by then Prime Minister Einar Gerhardsen, which became an important part of Norwegian political history.

The name
The Norse form of the name was Krákarøy. The first element is (probably) the genitive case of kráka meaning 'crow', the last element is øy meaning 'island'.

References 

Fredrikstad
Islands of Viken (county)
Populated places established in 1908
Populated places disestablished in 1994
Former municipalities of Norway
1908 establishments in Norway